The Itsanitaq Museum is a museum located in Churchill, Canada dedicated to Inuit culture.

History 
The intention with the creation of this museum was by Catholic missionaries to preserve the various artifacts of the native people of the northern part of Canada in 1944. The museum was founded by Jacques Volant, who held the position of curator until 1987.

Collections 

The museum contains some 1,300 items dating from the 1930s to the present day including sculptures, artwork, tools used by the natives of this area of Canada. Some artifacts are made of stone, whale bone or ivory. The museum has exhibits about the Dorset and Thule cultures. Among the Inuit-related exhibits are antique weapons, hunting equipment and wooden kayaks designed to navigate the Arctic Ocean. The museum also has exhibits on Arctic wildlife including animals such as Polar Bears, Muskox and Walrus. The museum has a section of books about the animals that inhabit the Arctic. The museum also preserves archaeological remains.

Gallery

References 

Museums in Manitoba
1944 establishments in Manitoba
Inuit art
Buildings and structures in Churchill, Manitoba
Inuit history
Museums established in 1944
Ethnographic museums in Canada